Petre Condrat (born 6 June 1981) is a Romanian sprint canoer who competed in the early to mid-2000s. He won four medals at the ICF Canoe Sprint World Championships with a gold (C-4 500 m: 2003), a silver (C-4 1000 m: 2005), and two bronzes (C-4 200 m: 2002, 2003).

References

Living people
Romanian male canoeists
Year of birth missing (living people)
ICF Canoe Sprint World Championships medalists in Canadian